Clara Martishia Woodruff Beebe (July 23, 1868 – December 29, 1927) was the second counselor in the general presidency of the Primary of the Church of Jesus Christ of Latter-day Saints (LDS Church) from 1905 to 1925.

Clara M. Woodruff was born in Salt Lake City, Utah Territory. She was the daughter of Wilford Woodruff and one of his plural wives, Emma Smith Woodruff.  Clara married Ovando C. Beebe, with whom she had eight children.

Clara Beebe attended the University of Deseret.  She had served in leadership positions of ward and stake primaries before being called to the Primary General Board in 1904.  In 1905, she was asked by the general president of the primary, Louie B. Felt, to replace Josephine R. West as her second counselor. Beebe served in this capacity until the presidency was dissolved in 1925 when Felt stepped down due to ill health. From this time until her death, Beebe again was a member of the General Board of the Primary.

As a member of the general presidency, Beebe oversaw the performance of baptisms for the dead by Primary-age children.

Beebe died in Salt Lake City at age 59 as a result of appendicitis.

Notes

References
2008 Deseret News Church Almanac (Salt Lake City, Utah: Deseret News, 2007) p. 122.
Andrew Jenson. Latter-day Saint Biographical Encyclopedia. 2:805; 4:247.
Encyclopedia of Mormonism, appendix 1, p. 1632.

1868 births
1927 deaths
American leaders of the Church of Jesus Christ of Latter-day Saints
Burials at Salt Lake City Cemetery
Counselors in the General Presidency of the Primary (LDS Church)
Deaths from appendicitis
Deaths from peritonitis
People from Salt Lake City
University of Utah alumni
Latter Day Saints from Utah